The Battle River Railway Trestle, commonly known as the Fabyan Trestle Bridge, was constructed between 1907 and December 10, 1908 west of Fabyan, Alberta, Canada at the cost of $600,000.  The bridge is located at approximately mile 149 of Canadian National Railway's (CN) Wainwright subdivision.

Overview
The steel trestle was designed by the Grand Trunk Pacific (GTP) railway as part of the company's westward construction to Edmonton. With the Battle River valley meandering west to east, a bridge had to be built in order to continue the westward trek, with its current location the most viable.

Upon completion, it was the largest railway structure in Canada until the Lethbridge Viaduct was completed in August 1909.

History

In 1907, the concrete footings of the bridge were poured. With the help of local farmers and other contractors, supplies were hauled in by wagons from Hardisty until construction began on the eastern side of the valley where supplies could be delivered by rail.

After its completion, the first train to cross over was the one being used to build it, while the first transportation train to cross was in January 1909.

When GTP was nationalized in 1923, the bridge became part of the main line of the CN.

Specifications
 Length: 
 Height:

Notable incidents

Construction deaths
During construction, three men died when their scow became swamped mid-stream. A cairn was later placed in their memory by their fellow workers.

2012 derailment
On 21 January 2012, at 16:17 MT, 31 of a 137-car CN train going from Winnipeg to Edmonton derailed approximately halfway across the bridge. Of the 31 cars, 17 of them carrying wheat and barley fell to the valley below. CN originally reported that all the cars were grain cars; however, requests made by a local government official revealed that dangerous goods were also being hauled, but they did not derail.

2017 derailment
On 17 October 2017, at 17:40 MT, a westbound CN train consisting of 13 cars and one engine derailed when it approached the west end of the trestle.  The 13 cars fell to the valley below, with the locomotive staying on the bridge, but not on the tracks.  The fallen cars supported intermodal containers (also known as shipping containers or Sea-Cans), all of which were damaged in the fall.

CN said that at the time of the derailment, the winds were in excess of 100 km/h.

, no information can be found about this incident in the webpages of the Transportation Safety Board of Canada (TSB), or in the webpages of CN. However, the incident is referenced in the TSB investigation report R18W0133 as a similar incident involving hopper cars or empty double-stack containers derailing due to extremely high wind gusts.

See also 

 List of bridges in Canada

References

External links
Battle River Railway Trestle -MD of Wainright No. 61

Canadian National Railway bridges in Canada
Railway bridges in Alberta
Bridges completed in 1908
Viaducts in Canada
Municipal District of Wainwright No. 61
1908 establishments in Alberta